Virgin and Child with two Angels is a panel painting by the Italian Renaissance painter Sandro Botticelli. It is on display in the Musée des Beaux-Arts of Strasbourg, France. Its inventory number is 558.

Owing to its comparatively poor condition, due to the peeling off of some tempera layers as well as some ancient restoration attempts, the painting had not unanimously been attributed to Botticelli himself: critics like Bernard Berenson, who had at first declared it to be genuine, later attributed it to Botticelli's workshop. Today, art historians largely agree that it is indeed an early painting by Sandro Botticelli. Some disagreement existed on how early, given that the painting displays clear influences of Botticelli's master Filippo Lippi (which would put it in the early 1460s), but also an obvious knowledge of the works of Andrea del Verrocchio (which would put it in the later 1460s). It is now agreed upon that the painting was made in the year 1468 or 1469.

It was inherited by the Strasbourg museum in 1908, together with other paintings from the Trübner collection, such as Van Everdingen's Nordic Landscape with a Castle on a Hill.

Description

References

External links 
Vierge à l’Enfant et deux anges , presentation of the painting on the museum's website

Paintings of the Madonna and Child by Sandro Botticelli
Paintings in the collection of the Musée des Beaux-Arts de Strasbourg
1468 paintings
1469 paintings
Angels in art
Oil paintings